The John Hastings Cottage is an historic house at 31 William Street in Worcester, Massachusetts.  Built about 1880, it is a distinctive example of Victorian Gothic architecture.  The house was listed on the National Register of Historic Places in 1980, where it is misspelled as "Hastins".

Description and history
The John Hastings Cottage is located in a densely built residential area west of downtown Worcester, on the north side of Williams Street just east of West Street.  It is a -story wood-frame structure, with a clapboarded exterior and complex roof line.  The roof has a number of gable ends, some of which have pierced aprons and bargeboard trim.  Its porch is also elaborately decorated, and the roof sports one of the few surviving 19th century cupolas left in the city.  The cupola is octagonal, with windows and paneling in alternating faces.  Some of the windows of the main block are framed by gabled wooden lintels and sills with peaked gables at the center.  Both the window and main gables have applied Stick style woodwork.  The front facade has a projecting bay, in which the eave is adorned by decorative woodwork.

The house was built about 1880 for John Hastings, a provisioner.  He owned it into the early 20th century.

See also
National Register of Historic Places listings in northwestern Worcester, Massachusetts
National Register of Historic Places listings in Worcester County, Massachusetts

References

Gothic Revival architecture in Massachusetts
Houses completed in 1880
Houses in Worcester, Massachusetts
National Register of Historic Places in Worcester, Massachusetts
Houses on the National Register of Historic Places in Worcester County, Massachusetts